Praga class of patrol boats are series of five Rigid-hulled inflatable boat built by M/s Praga Marine, India for National Coast Guard (NSG) organisation, Mauritius and are also referred as Heavy Duty Boat (HDB). They are intended for patrol, interception and search and rescue operations.

Description
Each boat in this class have a hull length of 8.9 meters, beam of 3.5 meters with a drought of 0.45 meter. They are propelled by two Johnson gasoline on-board motors which generate 400 HP. They have a high speed of 45 knots and range of 300 Nmiles at cruising speed of 35 knots. They have a complement for 4 crews and also have space for 4 passenger. The Praga class is successor of Mandovi Marine (15 Meter) Class Patrol Craft and have been in service since 2000.

Crafts in the class

Specifications
Displacement: 5 tonnes
Speed: 45 knots
Dimension: 8.9 m × 3.5 m × 0.45 m
Power: 2 Johnson gasoline engines, 400 bhp
Range: 300 nmiles at 35 knots
Crew: 4 crew + 4 passengers

See also
Military of Mauritius
GRSE Mauritius offshore patrol vessel

References

External links
 National Coast Guard of Mauritius

Patrol boat classes